Nameh-e Banuvan (Persian: Women's Letters) was a women's magazine published between 1920 and 1921. It was one of the publications that were started following Reza Shah's establishment his rule in Iran. Its founder was Shahnaz Azad who was also the publisher. The magazine was based in Tehran. The magazine was published biweekly and stated its aim as to encourage the emancipation of the Iranian women. It also attempted to remind male audience that women were their primary teachers.

References

1920 establishments in Iran
1921 disestablishments in Iran
Biweekly magazines
Defunct magazines published in Iran
Feminism in Iran
Feminist magazines
Magazines established in 1920
Magazines disestablished in 1921
Magazines published in Tehran
Persian-language magazines
Women's magazines published in Iran